Serik Sapiyev (born November 16, 1983) is an amateur boxer from Kazakhstan who won the world title in the light welterweight (-64 kg) division in 2005 and 2007 and Olympic Gold 2012 at welterweight. Sapiyev has signed up for the new AIBA professional league, called AIBA Pro Boxing (APB), which will launch in autumn 2013. He won the Val Barker Trophy for best boxer at the London Olympic Games in 2012. Now he works as general director of WSB.

Career

Light Welterweight
The fleetfooted southpaw counterpuncher defeated Dilshod Mahmudov at the 2005 World Amateur Boxing Championships.

He also won bronze at the 2006 Asian Games after losing to Thailand's Olympic Gold medallist Manus Boonjumnong whom he knocked down in the fight but still lost 18–22.

At the 2007 World Amateur Boxing Championships he reached the final by beating Manus conqueror Masatsugu Kawachi where he won against Russian fellow southpaw Gennady Kovalev 20:5.At the 2008 Olympics (results) he once again lost to defending champion Manus Boonjumnong 5:7 and moved up in weight.

Welterweight
At the 2009 World Amateur Boxing Championships he was upset in the semis by Russian southpaw Andrey Zamkovoy and won Bronze.

At the 2011 World Amateur Boxing Championships he won Silver, losing to Ukrainian Taras Shelestyuk.

Serik Sapiyev won Olympic gold (Results) and the Val Barker Trophy for best boxer at London 2012.
This time he defeated Andrey Zamkovoy in the semis and beat Fred Evans in the final.

World Amateur championship results 
2005
Defeated Pavol Hlavacka (Slovakia) 37-13
Defeated Karl Dargan (United States) 37-26
Defeated Mykola Semenyaga (Ukraine) 27-15
Defeated Emil Magerramov (Azerbaijan) 41-23
Defeated Dilshod Mahmudov (Uzbekistan) 39-21

2007
Defeated Milan Piperski (Serbia) 22-6
Defeated Eduardo Mendoza (boxer) (Nicaragua) RSCO 2
Defeated Kevin Bizier (Canada) RSCO 3
Defeated Morteza Sepahvandi (Iran) AB 4
Defeated Masatsugu Kawachi (Japan) RSCO 3
Defeated Gennady Kovalev (Russia) 20-5

References

External links
AIBA Bio

1983 births
Living people
Light-welterweight boxers
Boxers at the 2008 Summer Olympics
Boxers at the 2012 Summer Olympics
Olympic boxers of Kazakhstan
Asian Games medalists in boxing
Olympic gold medalists for Kazakhstan
Olympic medalists in boxing
Boxers at the 2006 Asian Games
Boxers at the 2010 Asian Games
Medalists at the 2012 Summer Olympics
People from Karaganda Region
Kazakhstani male boxers
AIBA World Boxing Championships medalists
Asian Games gold medalists for Kazakhstan
Asian Games bronze medalists for Kazakhstan
Medalists at the 2006 Asian Games
Medalists at the 2010 Asian Games